The Office of the Supreme Leader of Iran (Daftar-e Magham-e Moazzam-e Rahbari lit. Office of the Supreme Leadership Authority), also known as the House of Leadership (Beit-e Rahbari), is the official residence, bureaucratic office and principal workplace of the Supreme Leader of Iran since 1989.

Its structure is a mixture of traditional Beit (religious office of Marja') and bureaucracy. The institution is located in central Tehran and is run by Mohammad Mohammadi Golpayegani.

Overview
The Office of the Supreme Leader is used by the Supreme Leader to communicate and administer orders to various other military, cultural, economic, and political organizations. A number of political, military, and religious advisors work under this office. These advisors have an influential role in decisions made throughout country.

According to Ali Motahari, a former member of parliament from Tehran, the influence of the Office of the Supreme Leader in the country's affairs are so great that "the parliament is effectively a branch of the Office of the Supreme Leader".

Sanctions
On June 24, 2019, U.S. President Donald Trump signed Executive Order 13876, in which the assets of the Office of the Supreme Leader of Iran, along with Ali Khamenei, are frozen following the incident near the Gulf of Oman in the days prior.

See also
Ruhollah Khomeini's residency (Jamaran), similar compound of the previous supreme leader

References

External links
 

Buildings and structures in Tehran
Official residences in Iran
1989 establishments in Iran
Iranian entities subject to the U.S. Department of the Treasury sanctions
Ali Khamenei
Revolutionary institutions of the Islamic Republic of Iran